Bruno Marcotte (born September 10, 1974) is a Canadian figure skating coach and former competitor in pairs. He is the 1993 World Junior bronze medallist with Isabelle Coulombe and the 2000 Nebelhorn Trophy champion with Valérie Marcoux.

Personal life 
Bruno Marcotte was born October 10, 1974 in Montreal, Quebec. His sister, Julie, is a figure skating choreographer, who choreographs for his students. In July 2014, it was publicly announced that he was engaged to his student Meagan Duhamel. The couple married on June 5, 2015 in Bermuda. The couple have two daughters, Zoey and Miya.

Career 
Marcotte competed with Isabelle Coulombe early in his pairs career. They won the bronze medal at the 1993 World Junior Championships.

Marcotte teamed up with Nadia Micallef in around 1995. The pair won the 1998 Golden Spin of Zagreb and placed fourth at the 1999 Canadian Championships.

Marcotte formed a partnership with Valérie Marcoux in around 2000. They placed fourth twice at the Canadian Figure Skating Championships, fourth at the 2002 Four Continents Championships and 12th at the 2002 World Championships. The team broke up after the 2001–01 season and Marcotte retired from competition.

Marcotte is an ISU technical specialist for Canada. He formerly worked as the pair skating director at the BC Centre of Excellence in Vancouver. He formerly coached in Montreal with Richard Gauthier. 

In spring of 2019, it was announced that Marcotte would move to Oakville, Ontario to coach at the Skate Oakville Skating Club with wife, Meagan Duhamel.

His current students include:
  Riku Miura / Ryuichi Kihara
  Chloe Panetta / Kieran Thrasher
  Haruna Murakami / Sumitada Moriguchi
 Tilda Alteryd / Gabriel Farand
  Sophia Schaller / Livio Mayr

His former students include:
 Narumi Takahashi / Mervin Tran
  Meagan Duhamel / Eric Radford
  Natasha Purich / Mervin Tran
  Valentina Marchei / Ondrej Hotarek
  Marissa Castelli / Mervin Tran
  Natasha Purich / Andrew Wolfe
  Kirsten Moore-Towers / Michael Marinaro
  Olivia Serafini / Mervin Tran
  Caitlin Yankowskas / Hamish Gaman
  Elladj Baldé
  Niki Wories
  Ami Koga / Francis Boudreau-Audet
  Vanessa Grenier / Maxime Deschamps
  Lori-Ann Matte / Thierry Ferland
  Ami Koga / Spencer Akira Howe
  Ekaterina Alexandrovskaya / Harley Windsor
  Jelizaveta Žuková / Martin Bidař

Programs 
(with Marcoux)

Competitive highlights
GP: Grand Prix

With Marcoux

With Micallef

With Coulombe

References

External links
 

Canadian male pair skaters
1974 births
Living people
Figure skaters from Montreal
International Skating Union technical specialists
World Junior Figure Skating Championships medalists